Thorndike Proctor "Thorny" Hawkes (October 15, 1852 – February 2, 1929) was an American Major League Baseball second baseman, who played a total of two seasons in the Majors.

Career
Hawkes began his career playing for teams in his hometown of Danvers, Massachusetts. He then played for the Lynn Live Oaks and for Manchester of the New England League.

He played 64 games as the team's starting second baseman, and batted .208 in 250 at bats. On July 30, 1879 he set two records by fielding 18 chances without an error and making 12 putouts without an error.

His second was with the  Washington Nationals of the short-lived Union Association.  He played in 38 games as the team's starting second baseman, and batted .278 in 151 at bats. He finished his career with 102 games played, a .234 batting average, scored 40 runs, ten doubles, and did not hit a home run.

After retiring from baseball, Hawkes worked as a pharmacist and owned a drugstore in Danvers for many years.

Hawkes died at the age of 76 in Danvers and is interred at Holten Street Cemetery.

References

External links

1852 births
1929 deaths
19th-century baseball players
American pharmacists
Baseball players from Massachusetts
Haverhill (minor league baseball) players
Lynn Live Oaks players
Manchester (minor league baseball) players
Major League Baseball second basemen
People from Danvers, Massachusetts
Salem Fairies players
Sportspeople from Essex County, Massachusetts
Troy Trojans players
Washington Nationals (UA) players